2121 Sevastopol, provisional designation , is a stony Florian asteroid and synchronous binary system from the inner regions of the asteroid belt, approximately 10 kilometers in diameter. It was discovered  on 27 June 1971, by Russian astronomer Tamara Smirnova at the Crimean Astrophysical Observatory in Nauchnij, on the Crimean peninsula. Its minor-planet moon was discovered in 2010.

Orbit and characterization 

Sevastopol is a member of the Flora family, one of the largest groups of stony asteroids in the main-belt. It orbits the Sun in the inner main-belt at a distance of 1.8–2.6 AU once every 3 years and 3 months (1,179 days). Its orbit has an eccentricity of 0.18 and an inclination of 4° with respect to the ecliptic.

Satellite 

In 2010, a minor-planet moon, designated , was discovered around Sevastopol, orbiting at a distance of 26 kilometers with a diameter of 3.54 ± 0.17 km.

Naming 

The asteroid was named after the Crimean city on the 200th anniversary of its foundation. The approved naming citation was published by the Minor Planet Center on 28 January 1983.

References

External links 
 Asteroids with Satellites, Robert Johnston, johnstonsarchive.net
 Asteroid Lightcurve Database (LCDB), query form (info )
 Dictionary of Minor Planet Names, Google books
 Asteroids and comets rotation curves, CdR – Observatoire de Genève, Raoul Behrend
 Discovery Circumstances: Numbered Minor Planets (1)-(5000) – Minor Planet Center
 
 

002121
Discoveries by Tamara Mikhaylovna Smirnova
Named minor planets
002121
19710627